Qeshlaq (also Romanized as Qeshlāq) is a village in Kenarrudkhaneh Rural District, in the Central District of Golpayegan County, Isfahan Province, Iran. At the 2006 census, its population was 24, in 9 families.

References 

Populated places in Golpayegan County